Tony Umez is a Nigerian actor. He has acted in more than 200 Nollywood films of both English and Yoruba languages since his debut in the 1998 film Died Wretched: Buried in N2.3m Casket.

Early life and education
Tony Umez was born in Ogidi, Anambra State. His mother is from Cross River State while his father is from Ogidi, the same place he was born. Despite his Igbo origin, he doesn't speak Igbo but can fluently speak Efik, his mother's language.
Umez grew up in Lagos where he had his primary and secondary education.
He also has a bachelor's degree and master's degree in English and international law and diplomacy respectively from the University of Lagos.

Acting career
He started acting in his secondary days when he performed in stage plays and dramas. In 1993, the actor joined Nollywood. He did not get a dime from his two movies which made him leave the industry for a few years.
 He returned to the industry in 1997 and featured in the movie, "The Princess" but it was the movie,"Died Wretched" which was released in 1998 that made him popular.

Filmography

References

External links

Living people
Male actors in Yoruba cinema
20th-century Nigerian male actors
21st-century Nigerian male actors
University of Lagos alumni
Nigerian male film actors
1964 births
Nigerian male television actors
Igbo actors
Actors from Anambra State
20th-century Nigerian actors